The 1920 Chicago Boosters season was their first season in existence. The team was independent and posted a 7-1-6 record. They played in one APFA game.

Schedule 
The table below was compiled using the information from The Pro Football Archives. The winning teams score is listed first. If a cell is greyed out and has "N/A", then that means there is an unknown figure for that game. Green-colored rows indicate a win; yellow-colored rows indicate a tie; and red-colored rows indicate a loss.

References 

Chicago Boosters